If you leave may refer to:

"If You Leave", episode of Degrassi: The Next Generation (season 6)
If You Leave (Daughter album)
If You Leave... (Eleanor McEvoy album) 2013
"If You Leave" (song), by Orchestral Manoeuvres in the Dark
"If You Leave", song by Train from Train (album)

See also
Si Te Vas (disambiguation)